Folkers is a surname. Notable people with the surname include:

 Karl August Folkers (1906–1997), American biochemist 
 Lambert Folkers (died 1761), baker and politician
 Rich Folkers (born 1946) Major League Baseball pitcher 
 Ulrich Folkers (1915–1943), German U-boat commander